Roscanvel is a commune in the Finistère department of Brittany in north-western France.

Population
Inhabitants of Roscanvel are called in French Roscanvelistes.

See also
Quélern
Communes of the Finistère department
Parc naturel régional d'Armorique

References

Mayors of Finistère Association

External links

Official website 

Communes of Finistère